Bal or BAL may refer to:

People
 Bal (surname), including a list of people with the name
 Bal (given name), including a list of people with the name

Places
 Bal, Iran (disambiguation), several places
 Bal, Zira, Punjab, India
 Bäl, Gotland, Sweden

Science

Medicine
 Bio-artificial liver, a bioartificial liver device
 Blood alcohol content
 Bronchoalveolar lavage, a diagnostic method of the lower respiratory system
 British anti-Lewisite, or Dimercaprol, a medication to treat acute poisoning 
 Cholate—CoA ligase, or bile acid CoA ligase (BAL), an enzyme

Computing
 IBM Basic Assembly Language and successors
 Business application language

Transportation
 Balham station, London, England, station code BAL
 Baltimore Penn Station, Baltimore, Maryland, US, AMTRAK code BAL
 Batman Airport, Batman, Turkey, IATA airport code BAL

Other uses
 Bal (film), or Honey, a 2010 Turkish film
 8678 Bäl, a main belt asteroid
 Bal, a ground-launched version of the Russian Kh-35 anti-ship missile
 Balboa (dance), or bal
 Balboa High School (California), colloquially known as Bal, in San Francisco, US
 Bursa Anadolu Lisesi, or BAL, a high school in Bursa, Turkey
 Balochi language, ISO 939 language code bal
 Basketball Africa League
 Bushfire Attack Level assessment, in the AS3959 Australian construction standard

See also
 Bal maiden, a female manual labourer in the mining industries of Cornwall and western Devon, England
 Baltic states
 Baltimore, Maryland, US